Gaby Basset (29 March 1902 Varennes-Saint-Sauveur, Saône-et-Loire, France – 7 October 2001 Neuilly-sur-Seine, Hauts-de-Seine, France) was a French film actress.

Selected filmography

 Everybody Wins (1930) - Simone
 Le poignard malais (1931) - Maggy
 Departure (1931) - Carmen
 Par habitude (1932) - Madame Roussel
 Mannequin (1933) - Rose
 Pour être aimé (1933)
 Le coq du régiment (1933)
 Les deux 'Monsieur' de Madame (1933) - Léonie
 Le gros lot (1933)
 Le fakir du Grand Hôtel (1934) - Titi
 La châtelaine du Liban (1934) - Maroussia
 Prince Jean (1934) - Fernande
 Un tour de cochon (1934)
    (1935) - Mado (uncredited)
 La vierge du rocher (1935) - La petite Anna
 Le tampon du colonel (1935)
 La rosière des Halles (1935) - Françoise
 Fanfare of Love (1935) - Poupette
 Un soir de bombe (1935) - Lily
 La coqueluche de ces dames (1935)
 La mariée du régiment (1936)
 Sacré Léonce (1936) - Fifine
 Disk 413 (1936) - Cécile Meunier
 27 Rue de la Paix (1936) - Alice Perrin aka Jeanne Pinson
 The Secrets of the Red Sea (1937) - Anita
 Le tigre du Bengale (1938)
 The Indian Tomb (1938) - Mme. Morin
 The Porter from Maxim's (1939) - Crici
 Fire in the Straw (1939) - Reine Roy
 A Hole in the Wall (1950) - La cliente
 Le tampon du capiston (1950) - (uncredited)
 Lost Souvenirs (1950) - (uncredited)
 The Nude Dancer (1952) - Justine
 Double or Quits (1953) - Une voisine
 Mandat d'amener (1953) - La dame des livres
 Their Last Night (1953) - La prostituée
 Women of Paris (1953) - Henriette, l'employée des lavabos
 Touchez pas au grisbi (1954) - Marinette
 My Seven Little Sins (1954) - Maria
 House on the Waterfront (1955) - Madame Aimée
 La rue des bouches peintes (1955) - Madame Jules
 Tant qu'il y aura des femmes (1955) - Hortense Géricault
 Gas-Oil (1955) - Camille Serin
 Deadlier Than the Male (1956) - La femme de charge de la guinguette
 Diary of a Bad Girl (1956) - La patronne
 Le pays d'où je viens (1956) - Le cassière
 Speaking of Murder (1957) - Hortense
 Miss Catastrophe (1957) - Monique
 Le coin tranquille (1957) - (uncredited)
 La polka des menottes (1957) - La trompettiste
 Sinners of Paris (1958) - L'habilleuse
 Maigret Sets a Trap (1958) - Une bonne (uncredited)
 Le temps des oeufs durs (1958) - Martine Grandvivier
 First of May (1958) - Une infirmière
 Gangster Boss (1959) - La mère d'Etienne (uncredited)
 Archimède le clochard (1959) - Mme Grégoire
 Way of Youth (1959) - Lucette, la soeur de Tiercelin
 Rue des prairies (1959) - Mme Gildas
 L'ours (1960)
 Les honneurs de la guerre (1961) - Madame Sauvage
 Alerte au barrage (1961)
 The Devil and the Ten Commandments (1962) - L'habilleuse (segment "Tes père et mère honoreras")
 Drôle de jeu (1968) - (final film role)

References

Bibliography 
 Goble, Alan. The Complete Index to Literary Sources in Film. Walter de Gruyter, 1999.

External links 
 
https://en.unifrance.org/directories/person/127275/gaby-basset

1902 births
2001 deaths
French film actresses
20th-century French women